Varun Dhawan (born 24 April 1987) is an Indian actor who works in Hindi films. One of India's highest-paid celebrities, he has been featured in Forbes India Celebrity 100 list since 2014. The son of film director David Dhawan, he studied business management from the Nottingham Trent University. He began his work in the film industry as an assistant director to Karan Johar on the drama film My Name Is Khan (2010), and subsequently made his acting debut in 2012 with Johar's teen drama Student of the Year. Dhawan has featured in eleven consecutive box-office successes between 2012 and 2018.

Awards and nominations

Other awards and recognition

References

External links 
 Varun Dhawan awards at IMDb

Lists of awards received by Indian actor